This article lists all power stations in Algeria.

Gas

Hydroelectric

Integrated solar combined cycle 
 Hassi R'Mel – the steam generated integrates into the steam cycle of a 150MW combined cycle gas turbine plant

See also 

 List of largest power stations in the world
 List of power stations
 List of power stations in Africa

References 

Algeria
Energy in Algeria
Economy of Algeria-related lists
Power stations